Gemini is a Hungarian rock band established in 1965 and reformed in 1979. Their first LP was released in 1976.

Members

 Gábor Várszegi (bass, 1965–79)
 Gyula Bardóczi (drums, 1965–79)
 György Szabó (vocals, 1965–75)
 Gábor Pusztai (guitar, 1965–79)
 Zoltán Kékes (guitar, 1969–72)
 András Markó (organ, 1969–71, 1973-?)
 Iván Rusznyák (guitar, 1971–79)
 Imre Papp (keyboards, vocals, 1971–81)
 László Baranszky (guitar, 1972–79)
 Gábor Heilig (bass, vocals, 1975–79)
 Gábor Dávid (drums, 1979-?)
 Edit Szigeti (guitar, 1979-?)
 Gábor Albert (bass, 1979-?)

Discography

Studio albums

 Gemini (1976)

Singles

 Aki soha nem próbálta / Nem nyugszik a szívem (SP 964, 1972)
 Lívia (other side: Victor Máté: Szólj a fűre, fákra) (SP 988, 1972)
 Vándorlás a hosszú úton / Neked csak egy idegen (SP 70113, 1973)
 Ki mondja meg (other side: Syconor: Kék égből szőtt szerelem) (SP 70139, 1973)
 Ez a dal lesz az üzenet (other side: Apostol: Gyere, gyere, gyorsan) (SP 70192, 1975)
 Rock and Roll / Hogyha újból gyerek lennék (SPS 70184, 1975)
 Álomvonat (other side: Illés: Hogyha egyszer (SPS 70275, 1977)
 Félek (other side: M 7: Mondd meg bátran) (SPS 70422, 1980)

Sources
 Ki kicsoda a magyar rockzenében?
 Gemini  Allmusic.hu

External links
 http://rateyourmusic.com/artist/gemini_f3

Hungarian rock music groups